Cowlitz Falls Dam is a 70 megawatt hydroelectric dam in Lewis County, Washington. It was constructed in the early 1990s and completed in 1994.

Its reservoir, Lake Scanewa, is located at the confluence of the Cowlitz River and Cispus River downstream of Randle, Washington with a surface area of about 700 acres.

The Cowlitz Falls Project impounds the Cowlitz River and produces on average 260 gigawatthours annually for the local public utility, the Lewis County Public Utility District, or about one-third of its annual electrical needs.  The facility was developed jointly with the Bonneville Power Administration, and the BPA bears the direct cost of operating and maintaining the dam.

See also

List of dams in the Columbia River watershed

References 

Dams in Washington (state)
Reservoirs in Washington (state)
United States local public utility dams
Hydroelectric power plants in Washington (state)
Dams completed in 1994
Energy infrastructure completed in 1994